Calytrix is a genus of shrubs in the family Myrtaceae described as a genus in 1806. They are commonly known as starflowers.

Species
The genus includes the following species:

 Calytrix achaeta (F.Muell.) Benth.
 Calytrix acutifolia (Lindl.) Craven
 Calytrix alpestris (Lindl.) Court - snow myrtle
 Calytrix amethystina Craven
 Calytrix angulata Lindl. - yellow starflower
 Calytrix arborescens (F.Muell.) Benth.
 Calytrix asperula (Schauer) Benth. - brush starflower
 Calytrix aurea Lindl.
 Calytrix birdii (F.Muell.) B.D.Jacks.
 Calytrix brachychaeta (F.Muell.) Benth.
 Calytrix brevifolia (Meisn.) Benth.
 Calytrix breviseta Lindl.
 Calytrix brownii (Schauer) Craven
 Calytrix brunioides A.Cunn.
 Calytrix carinata Craven
 Calytrix chrysantha Craven
 Calytrix ciliata (Turcz.) Benth.
 Calytrix conferta A.Cunn.
 Calytrix creswellii (F.Muell.) B.D.Jacks.
 Calytrix cupressifolia A.Rich.
 Calytrix curtophylla A.Cunn.
 Calytrix decandra DC. - pink starflower
 Calytrix decussata Craven
 Calytrix depressa (Turcz.) Benth.
 Calytrix desolata S.Moore
 Calytrix divergens Craven
 Calytrix diversifolia (Turcz.) B.D.Jacks.
 Calytrix drummondii (Meisn.) Craven
 Calytrix duplistipulata Craven
 Calytrix ecalycata Craven
 Calytrix empetroides (Schauer) Benth.
 Calytrix eneabbensis Craven
 Calytrix ericoides A.Cunn.
 Calytrix erosipetala Craven
 Calytrix exstipulata DC. - Kimberley heather 
 Calytrix faucicola Craven
 Calytrix flavescens A.Cunn. - summer starflower
 Calytrix formosa Craven
 Calytrix fraseri A.Cunn. - pink summer calytrix
 Calytrix glaberrima (F.Muell.) Craven
 Calytrix glabra R.Br.
 Calytrix glutinosa Lindl.
 Calytrix gracilis Benth.
 Calytrix granulosa Benth.
 Calytrix gurulmundensis Craven
 Calytrix gypsophila Craven
 Calytrix habrantha Craven
 Calytrix harvestiana (F.Muell.) Craven
 Calytrix inopinata Craven
 Calytrix involucrata J.M.Black - cup fringe-myrtle
 Calytrix islensis Craven
 Calytrix laricina Benth.
 Calytrix leptophylla Benth.
 Calytrix leschenaultii (Schauer) Benth.
 Calytrix longiflora (F.Muell.) Benth.
 Calytrix megaphylla (F.Muell.) Benth.
 Calytrix merrelliana (F.Muell. & Tate) Craven
 Calytrix micrairoides Craven
 Calytrix microcoma Craven
 Calytrix mimiana Craven
 Calytrix mitchellii S.Moore
 Calytrix muricata (F.Muell.) Benth.
 Calytrix nematoclada Craven
 Calytrix oldfieldii Benth.
 Calytrix oncophylla Craven
 Calytrix parvivallis Craven
 Calytrix patrickiae Rye
 Calytrix paucicostata Craven
 Calytrix pimeleoides C.A.Gardner ex Keighery
 Calytrix platycheiridia Craven
 Calytrix plumulosa (F.Muell.) B.D.Jacks.
 Calytrix praecipua Craven
 Calytrix puberula (Meisn.) Benth.
 Calytrix pubescens G.Don
 Calytrix pulchella (Turcz.) B.D.Jacks.
 Calytrix purpurea (F.Muell.) Craven
 Calytrix rupestris Craven
 Calytrix sagei Rye
 Calytrix sapphirina Lindl.
 Calytrix scabra DC.
 Calytrix similis Craven
 Calytrix simplex Lindl.
 Calytrix smeatoniana (F.Muell.) Craven
 Calytrix stenophylla W.Fitzg.
 Calytrix stipulosa W.Fitzg.
 Calytrix stowardii S.Moore
 Calytrix strigosa A.Cunn.
 Calytrix sullivanii (F.Muell.) B.D.Jacks.
 Calytrix superba C.A.Gardner & A.S.George - superb starflower
 Calytrix surdiviperana Craven
 Calytrix sylvana Craven
 Calytrix tenuifolia (Meisn.) Benth.
 Calytrix tenuiramea (Turcz.) Benth.
 Calytrix tetragona Labill. - common fringe-myrtle 
 Calytrix truncata A.Cunn.
 Calytrix truncatifolia Craven
 Calytrix uncinata Craven
 Calytrix variabilis Lindl.
 Calytrix verruculosa Craven
 Calytrix verticillata Craven
 Calytrix viscida Rye
 Calytrix violacea (Lindl.) Craven
 Calytrix warburtonensis Craven
 Calytrix watsonii (F.Muell. & Tate) C.A.Gardner
 Calytrix wickhamiana S.Moore

References

 
 

 
Myrtaceae genera
Endemic flora of Australia
Myrtales of Australia
Taxa named by Jacques Labillardière